Karaurgan is a flag stop near the village of Karaurgan in the Kars Province of Turkey. The Eastern Express services the station, operated by the Turkish State Railways, between Istanbul and Kars.

Geography of Kars Province
Railway stations in Kars Province
Railway stations opened in 1962
1962 establishments in Turkey
Sarıkamış District